Nhandu cerradensis is a species of spider from the genus Nhandu. The species is originally described by Rogério Bertani in 2001.

References

Sources

 

Theraphosidae
Taxa named by Rogério Bertani